Days of Tafree is a 2016 Bollywood comedy film written and directed by Krishnadev Yagnik. Produced by Anand Pandit and Rashmi Sharma, it revolves around lives of seven friends in a college. It is an official remake of the 2015 Gujarati film, Chhello Divas.

Days of Tafree released on 23 September 2016.

Cast
 Yash Soni as Nikhil
 Ansh Bagri as Vicky
 Sanchay Goswami as Suresh
 Nimisha Mehta as Pooja
 Kinjal Rajpriya as Nisha 
 Sarabjeet Bindra as Dhula
 Anuradha Mukherjee as Isha
 Mamta Chaudhary as Vandana

Reception

Box office
The film received poor response at the box office and earned 60 lakhs in the first weekend. During the run, the film made 19.8 crores.

Soundtrack

References

External links
 

Hindi remakes of Gujarati films
2010s Hindi-language films
2016 films
Films directed by Krishnadev Yagnik